Saud Khamis Al-Farsi (born 3 April 1993), commonly known as Saud Al-Farsi, is an Omani footballer who plays for Al-Oruba SC.

Club career statistics

International career
Saud is part of the first team squad of the Oman national football team. He was selected for the national team for the first time in 2014. He made his first appearance for Oman  on 25 December 2013 against Bahrain in the 2014 WAFF Championship. He has made an appearance in the 2014 WAFF Championship.

Honours

Club
With Sur
Oman Professional League Cup (1): 2007

References

External links

Saud Al Farsi at Goalzz.com
Saud Al Farsi at Kooora.com

1993 births
Living people
People from Sur, Oman
Omani footballers
Oman international footballers
Association football midfielders
Sur SC players
Oman Professional League players
Footballers at the 2014 Asian Games
Asian Games competitors for Oman